Lengshuijiang is a county-level city in Hunan Province, China, it is under the administration of Loudi prefecture-level City. Located in central Hunan, the city is bordered to the north and west by Xinhua County, to the south by Xinshao County, to the east by Lianyuan City. As of 2015, it has a registered population of 370,300 and a resident population of 342,700. The city has four subdistricts, five towns and a township under its jurisdiction, the government seat is Lengshuijiang Subdistrict.

Lengshuijiang was incorporated as a city in 1960 which created from parts of Xinhua County. It is a resource-based city which is rich in antimony, it has the world's largest antimony mine (more than 50% of the world's production of antimony).

Subdivision
According to the result on adjustment of township-level administrative divisions of Lengshuijiang on November 23, 2015, the divisions of Lengshuijiang, according to the result on adjustment of township-level administrative divisions of Lengshuijiang on November 23, 2015:  Kuangshan Township was merged into Xikuangshan Subdistrict, Yankou Town was merged into Duoshan Town, Zilong Township was merged into Zhadu Town, Panqiao Township, Tongxing Township and Maoyi Town were revoked.

Geography

Lengshuijiang is located in the middle of Hunan province, on foothills of the Xuefeng Mountains and along the Zi River. The city is bordered to the north by Anhua County, to the east by Lianyuan, to the south by Xinshao, and to the west and northwest by Xinhua.

River

Reservoirs
Zhoutou Reservoir is a reservoir and the largest body of water in the city.

Mountains

Climate
It exhibits four distinct seasons.

Economy
As of 2016, Lengshuijiang's GDP is CN￥ 28,880,000,000. The city's economy is dominated by coal resource, which is venerated as "Coal Sea in Jiangnan".

Demographics

Population
As of 2016, the National Bureau of Statistics of the People's Republic of China estimates the city's population now to be 372,400. Lengshuijiang is mainly Han nationality with Miao, Hui and Tujia ethnic minorities.

Language
Mandarin is the official language. The local people speak Loudi dialect.

Religion
The city hosts religious institutions of various faiths, including Christianity, Islam, Chinese folk religion, Buddhism, and Taoism.

Education
As of 2016, Lengshuijiang has two high schools, 11 middle schools, 57 primary schools and 78 kindergartens.

Lengshuijiang Normal School is an institution of higher education in Lengshuijiang, which has no university.

Transportation

Railway
The Shanghai–Kunming railway, from Shanghai to Kunming, southwest China's Yunnan province, through the middle of the city.

The Shanghai–Kunming high-speed railway, also passes through the southwestern city.

Expressway
The S70 Loudi–Huaihua Expressway, more commonly known as "Louhuai Expressway", is a west–east highway passing through the southwestern city.

Provincial Highway
The Provincial Highway S312 runs east to west through the city.

The Provincial Highway S217 is a north–south highway passing through the town of Sanjian.

Tourism

Boyue Cave is situated in Zhonglian Township. It is the most well-known tourist spot in the city. The spot was used for location filming of the 1986 fantasy television series Journey to the West.

Dachengshan Scenic Spot is a provincial-level scenic spot in southeastern Lengshuijiang.

Zhoutouhu Holiday Resort is a popular attraction in the city for recreation for residents.

Notable people
 Duan Chuxian (1889–1954), entrepreneur.
 Jiang Yunqing (1914–2000), a notable soldier in the Red Army.
 Su Jing (1912–1989), politician.
 Su Peng (1880–1853), revolutionist.
 Xie Bingying (1906–2000), writer.
 Xie Dingzhong (born 1938), chemist.
 Zeng Jie (1886–1941), mathematician.
 Zhu Jiang (1916–1988), an official in the People's Liberation Army.

References

External links 

 
Cities in Hunan
County-level divisions of Hunan
Loudi